Mahmoudi (also spelled Mahmoodi or Mahmudi) may refer to:

Surname
 Baghdadi Mahmudi, Libyan politician
 Behnam Mahmoudi, Iranian volleyball player
 Hamid Mahmoudi, Canadian footballer
 Hasan Mahmudi Kamboh, Indian minister
 Hoda Mahmoudi, Iranian-American sociologist
 Jahangir Mahmoudi, Iranian lawyer
 Morteza Mahmoudi, Iranian nanotechnologist
 Nur Mahmudi Ismail, Indonesian politician
 Raza Mahmoudi, Afghan footballer
 Reza Mahmoudi, Iranian footballer 

Arabic-language surnames
Iranian-language surnames
Patronymic surnames
Surnames from given names